Ginataang hipon is a Filipino seafood soup made from shrimp in coconut milk and spices. It differs from other types of ginataan (which also commonly include shrimp), in that it does not use vegetables. It is a type of ginataan. Variants of the dish includes ginataang curacha and ginataang sugpo, which use spanner crabs and prawn (or lobster) in place of shrimp, respectively.

Description
Ginataang hipon is one of the simpler types of ginataan. The basic recipe includes unshelled shrimp with the heads intact, coconut milk, onion, garlic, ginger/turmeric, patis (fish sauce) or bagoong alamang (shrimp paste), and salt and pepper to taste. It can also be spiced with siling haba or labuyo peppers. The onion and garlic are first sautéed in oil in a pan, followed by the shrimp, then the rest of the ingredients are added until cooked. Some recipes prefer to boil the coconut milk until it is reduced and oily, while others keep the dish soupy. Coconut cream is also preferred if available, instead of thin coconut milk. The dish does not normally include any type of vegetables. Some versions, however, add leafy vegetables, bamboo shoots (labong), tomatoes, and/or cucumber.

Variants
Ginataang hipon can also be cooked with spanner crabs (ginataang curacha) or prawns/lobsters (ginataang sugpo). A notable variant of ginataang curacha is curacha Alavar.

See also
Halabos
Pininyahang hipon
Coconut soup
List of dishes using coconut milk
 List of soups

References

Philippine soups
Foods containing coconut
Shrimp dishes
Philippine seafood dishes